The nuclear receptor 4A3 (NR4A3) (nuclear receptor subfamily 4, group A, member 3) also known as neuron-derived orphan receptor 1 (NOR1) is a protein that in humans is encoded by the NR4A3 gene. NR4A3 is a member of the nuclear receptor family of intracellular transcription factors.

NR4A3 plays a central regulatory role in cell proliferation, differentiation, mitochondrial respiration, metabolism and apoptosis

Interactions 

NR4A3 has been shown to interact with SIX3.

See also 
 NUR nuclear receptor family

References

Further reading

External links 
 

Intracellular receptors
Transcription factors